Douglas Melville (born 17 February 1928) was a South African water polo player. He competed in the men's tournament at the 1952 Summer Olympics.

References

External links
 

1928 births
Possibly living people
South African male water polo players
Olympic water polo players of South Africa
Water polo players at the 1952 Summer Olympics
Sportspeople from Johannesburg